Rui Miguel Mateus Teixeira, known as Schuster (born 4 March 1978) is a retired Portuguese football midfielder.

References

1978 births
Living people
People from Vila Real, Portugal
Portuguese footballers
S.C. Salgueiros players
Associação Naval 1º de Maio players
Leça F.C. players
F.C. Felgueiras players
A.D. Ovarense players
S.C. Dragões Sandinenses players
Portimonense S.C. players
AEK Kouklia F.C. players
Association football midfielders
Primeira Liga players
Portuguese expatriate footballers
Expatriate footballers in Spain
Portuguese expatriate sportspeople in Spain
Expatriate footballers in Cyprus
Portuguese expatriate sportspeople in Cyprus
Sportspeople from Vila Real District